The Recipe Project is a CD-book combo that is the result of collaboration by both chefs and musicians to examine the previously unexplored correlation between music and food. Presented by Black Balloon Publishing, The Recipe Project includes a CD of the recipes of famous chefs put to music, as well as a book in which those recipes are written down (not unlike lyrics) plus interviews with the chefs themselves, and the thoughts of top culinary writers.

The project began when co-founders of the band One Ring Zero, Michael Hearst and Joshua Camp decided to take the recipe for Brains and Eggs by American chef Chris Cosentino and use it, word for word, as song lyrics, and as an added bonus collaborated with the chef by asking him what kind of genre of music he would prefer his recipe be sung as. Their little idea soon snowballed into a huge project that brought together world class chefs like Mario Batali, Isa Chandra Moskowitz, Tom Colicchio, musicians, writers and foodies alike, and went on to ask some interesting questions about the nature of the relationship between food and music. For instance, after hearing of the project, Grub Street San Francisco wrote, "So if chefs are like the new rock stars, should chefs also get to be actual rock stars?". 

The reviews for the project were for the most part very positive, Edible Brooklyn called the CD "A feast for the ears,". Time (magazine) wrote "Every once in a while you come across a project and think, I can’t believe no one has done this before,".
As well as the book and CD, there is also a free app for The Recipe Project that is available on iPhone, iPod touch, and iPad. The app allows the user to put in up to five ingredients, and it will find a tasty, simple recipe using those ingredients. The app also has a listening feature which plays One Ring Zero's music while you make your new found recipe. In Toque Magazine's Food App Review of the Week the reviewer wrote "... I find this app nicely put together and oddly charming,".

References

American cookbooks
Black Balloon Publishing books